Bireuën or Bireun is an Indonesian town, the seat of the Bireuën Regency government in the Aceh Special Territory of Sumatra. The town (officially called Kota Juang District) had a population of 44,604 at the 2010 Census and 47,670 at the 2020 Census.

Climate
Bireuen has a tropical rainforest climate (Af) with moderate rainfall from February to September and heavy rainfall from October to January.

References 

 
Populated places in Aceh
Regency seats of Aceh